Ako me pogledneš vo oči is the third studio album by the Macedonian singer Toše Proeski. The album was released in Macedonia and in Serbia & Montenegro, Bosnia and Herzegovina under the Serbian title Ako me pogledaš u oči. The album was released in Bulgaria too.

Working on the album

Background
Tose started recording his third album with title Ako me pogledneš vo oči (If You Look into My Eyes) in Macedonia. The recording of the songs were made in Fase One Recording Studios, a music studio in Athens, Greece. The album was recorded in two versions: Macedonian and Serbian.

The album's songs were mostly written by Phoebus and arranged by Manolis Vlachos. The Serbian lyrics were written by Marina Tucaković, while Miodrag Vrčakovski was the songwriter for the Macedonian versions.

It also features Esma Redžepova and Harem III.

Promotion
The Macedonian version of the album, written by Phoebus, Miodrag Vrčakovski, and Marina Tucaković, as well as the arranger Manolis Vlachos, was released by the end of October 2002. His third album was also released for the Serbia and Montenegro's market by BK Sound, and had its promotion in Bosnia and Herzegovina, as well as Bulgaria (under the label of Bulgarian Music Company BMK).

Track listing
"Ako me pogledneš vo oči/Ako me pogledaš u oči (If you look into my eyes) (Greek Version: "I ipothesi mas ekkremei" by Giorgos Lempesis)
Soba za taga/Soba za tugu (Room for sorrow) (Original Version: "Sigkinonounta Doheia" by Dionisis Schinas)
Magija/Čini (feat. Esma) (Magic)
Hold Me Tight
Uste edna skala/Još jedan stepenik (One more step)
Mesto na zlostorot/Na mjesto zločina (Crime scene)
Limenka (A Can) (Greek Version: "Taram taram tam" by Dionisis Schinas)
Studena/Ledena (A girl like ice) (Greek Version: "Hristougenna" by Despina Vandi)
Nemaš ni Blagodaram/Meni hvala nijedno (You don't even thank me) (Greek Version: "Oute ena efharisto" by Despina Vandi)
Luda mala (Greek version: "Mou tairiazeis" by Dionysis Sxonias
Limenka (club mix) (single track) (A Can)

Chart positions

Awards
Golden Lady Bug
 The Best Male Singer of the Year
 Album of the Year
 Song of the year (Nemas Ni Blagodaram)

References

Toše Proeski albums
2002 albums